Andrés Arroyo may refer to:
 Andrés Arroyo (athlete) (born 1995), Puerto Rican athlete
 Andrés Arroyo (footballer) (born 2002), Colombian footballer